Izu may refer to:

Places
Izu Province, a part of modern-day Shizuoka prefecture in Japan
Izu, Shizuoka, a city in Shizuoka prefecture
Izu Peninsula, near Tokyo
Izu Islands, located off the Izu Peninsula

People with the surname
, Japanese photographer

Japanese-language surnames